Blucher is an unincorporated community in Saskatchewan

Blucher No. 343, Saskatchewan
Unincorporated communities in Saskatchewan